Spirit is the seventh studio album by American band Earth, Wind & Fire, released on September 28, 1976 by Columbia Records. The album rose to No. 2 on both the Billboard 200 and Top Soul Albums charts. Spirit has also been certified Double Platinum in the US by the RIAA.

Singles
"Getaway" reached No. 1 on the Billboard Hot Soul Songs chart. The single also rose to No. 12 on both the Billboard Hot 100 and Disco Action Top 30 charts. "Saturday Nite, peaked at No. 4 on the Billboard Hot Soul Songs chart and No. 21 on the Billboard Hot 100 chart. The song also reached No. 12 on Billboard's Disco Action Top 30 chart and No. 17 on the UK Pop Singles chart.

Overview
The band's long time collaborator Charles Stepney died in the midst of its recording sessions, Maurice White went on to mostly arrange and produce the album. The LP was entitled Spirit in dedication to Stepney.

Critical reception

Craig Werner of Vibe gave a 4.5 out of 5 rating, calling Spirit "one of the group's defining moments" and "gospel soul for the ages".  
Billboard found that the album's "arrangements, songs, sweet floating vocal harmonies and punching instrumental phrases are all best described as impeccable".  Joe McEwen of Rolling Stone exclaimed "Though most of Spirit maintains a high level of artistic competence, I find the new album to be like a bean-sprout salad — undeniably nutritious, but hardly filling."
With a 4.5 out of 5 stars rating Alex Henderson of Allmusic called the record "outstanding". Henderson added "Maurice White's message and vision (an interesting blend of Afro-American Christianity and Eastern philosophy) was as positive and uplifting as ever, and as always, EWF expressed this positivity without being Pollyanna-ish or corny. And even if one didn't take EWF's calls for unity, hard work, self-respect, and faith in God to heart, they had no problem with their solid grooves." Robert Christgau of the Village Voice gave a B grade saying "Most of these songs are fun to listen to."
Music Week proclaimed "With a more spiritual, ethereal feel than the six albums that had already cut to that point, it really marks a turning point in their career and is crammed with excellent tunes." Rick Atkinson of The Record wrote "Any album that can hit the album charts, the single charts, and discos all at once is a guaranteed success.	
John Rockwell of The New York Times declared that "What is most interesting about Maurice White and his musicians..is their refusal to be locked into any stylistic format Mr. White's record will be labeled 'disco' in some quarters, and indeed parts of if, would not sound out of place in a disco. But, generally, Earth, Wind and Fire is closer to jazz, or to jazz‐rock, than to the thumping formulas of disco. And yet the group isn't afraid to slip in a ballad, either." Variety also described the album as "Another solid rhythm and blues session with one of the slickest acts of the genre, Earth, Wind & Fire, which always keeps it together. "A couple of instrumentals break up a lot of smooth, polished vocal instrumental trips."

Isaac Hayes called Spirit one of Earth, Wind & Fire's five essential recordings.
Rick Atkinson of The Record placed Spirit at number 5 on his list of the top 15 albums of 1976. Spirit was also nominated for an American Music Award for Favorite Soul/R&B Album. A song from the album called Earth, Wind and Fire was also Grammy nominated in the category of Best Instrumental Composition.

Track listing

Original release

2001 Legacy reissue (CK 65739)

Personnel
Vocals - Maurice White, Philip Bailey, Verdine White
Piano, Keyboards - Larry Dunn, Jerry Peters
Organ - Larry Dunn
Moog synthesizer - Larry Dunn
Guitar - Al McKay, Johnny Graham
Bass - Verdine White
Congas - Philip Bailey
Kalimba - Maurice White
Timbales - Maurice White
Drums - Fred White, Ralph Johnson, Maurice White
Percussion - Fred White, Ralph Johnson, Al McKay, Andrew Woolfolk, Verdine White, Philip Bailey, Harvey Mason
Saxophone - Don Myrick, Andrew Woolfolk
Trombone - George Bohanon, Louis Satterfield, Charles Loper
Bass Trombone - Lew McCreary
Trumpet - Oscar Brashear, Charles Findley, Michael Harris, Steve Madaio
French horn - David Duke, Arthur Maebe, Sidney Muldrow, Marilyn Robinson
Tuba - Tommy Johnson
Concertmaster - Charles Veal
Harp - Dorothy Ashby
Cello - Ronald Cooper, Marie Fera, Dennis Karmazyn, Harry Shlutz
Viola - Marilyn Baker, David Campbell, Denyse Buffum, Rollice Dale, James Dunham, Paul Polivnick, Lynn Subotnick, Barbara Thomason
Violin - Asa Drori, Winterton Garvey, Harris Goldman, Carl LaMagna, Joy Lyle, Sandy Seemore, Haim Shtrum, Ken Yerke

Production
Producers - Maurice White (Original recording), Charles Stepney (Original recording), Leo Sacks (Reissue)
Arrangers - Jerry Peters (8-9), Charles Stepney (1-3, 5-7), Tom Tom 84 (4)
Engineer, Remix - George Massenburg
Audio Mixing - Paul Klingberg (10-14), Leo Sacks (10-14), Maurice White (10-14)

Charts and certifications

Charts

Year-end charts

Certifications

References

Earth, Wind & Fire albums
1976 albums
Albums produced by Maurice White
Albums produced by Charles Stepney
Columbia Records albums
Albums recorded at Westlake Recording Studios
Albums recorded at Wally Heider Studios